Xanthomonadaceae is a family of Pseudomonadota within the Xanthomonadales order. It was previously known as Lysobacteraceae.

References

External links
 National J.P. Euzéby: List of Prokaryotic names with Standing in Nomenclature (LPSN)